Bohushi (Yiddish: Bohush) is a village in the Rivne Raion, Rivne Oblast, Ukraine, but was formerly administered within Berezne Raion.

Shtetls

Villages in Rivne Raion